Wilo SE is a European manufacturer of pumps and pump systems for the building technology, water and industrial sectors with headquarters in Dortmund, Germany. Founded in 1872 as copper and brass factory by Louis Opländer, the company has over 60 subsidiaries in more than 50 countries and employs about 8,200 people worldwide (2021 annual average).

Wilo SE is the managerial holding of the WILO group, a result of a merger between Wilo-Salmson AG and Wilo GmbH in 2002. For the year 2021, the company registered a revenue of EUR 1,651.9 million with an EBIT of EUR 181.1 million. EUR 71 million was spent by the group for research and development in 2021. The group manufactures pumps and pump systems at 15 production facilities across Europe, Asia and America. The group produce about 10 million pumps annually.

History 
Caspar Ludwig ("Louis") Opländer founded the company in 1872 as a copper and brassware factory in Dortmund. The Caspar Ludwig Opländer Foundation, founded by the Opländer family in 2011, is the majority shareholder of the WILO SE with a stake of approximately 90 percent.

WILO group is managed by an executive board and a supervisory board composed of internationally recognised business leaders. The Wilo Executive Board members include Oliver Hermes (Chairman & CEO), Georg Weber (CTO) and Mathias Weyers (CFO).

Brands

Wilo 
Wilo is a manufacturer of pumps, submersible mixers and related intelligent control systems. The product portfolio includes complete range of centrifugal pumps starting from small circulator, inline, multistage, submersible, end-suction, split case, vertical turbine to packaged Pumping stations. Product development and manufacturing of Wilo products is based mainly in Germany and France.

Salmson 
Salmson is a manufacturer of pumps and pump systems for domestic and municipal applications based in France. Founded in 1890, Salmson has been a brand under Wilo group since 1984. From 24 September 2018, the company has decided to dissolve Salmson and concentrate on Wilo as its sole brand. As a result, Salmson products have been replaced by Wilo products and the Salmson brand will completely disappear over time.

Mather and Platt 
Mather and Platt which started operations in India in 1913 is a specialist manufacturer of large capacity engineered centrifugal pumps such as Multi-stage, Vertical Turbine, Non-clog and Axial Split Case for water and sewage applications. Mather and Platt Pumps Ltd. became a part of WILO SE in the year 2005. The subsidiary which was renamed as Wilo Mather and Platt Pvt. Ltd, will be known as Wilo India from 2020.

GVA 
GVA is a specialist manufacturer of aeration systems and agitators for biological wastewater treatment based in Germany. WILO SE acquired GVA in January 2016 and ever since the brand has been renamed as Wilo GVA.

American-Marsh 
American-Marsh Pumps is a manufacturer of centrifugal & positive displacement pumps, electrical motors, mechanical seals and fire protection fittings, couplings and pumping equipment. Headquartered in Collierville, Tennessee, American-Marsh is over 140 years old and is one of the oldest pump manufacturers in the world. WILO SE acquired American-Marsh Pumps LLC. in 2019. The production will be relocated to the new Wilo USA headquarters bringing the operations of Wilo USA, Weil Pump, Scot Pump and American-Marsh Pumps to a single production site.

Weil 
Weil Pump, located in Cedarburg, WI, specializes in the manufacture of waste water pumps and end-suction centrifugal pumps with a series of full cast stainless steel submersible pumps for chemical applications. Weil Pumps was acquired by Wilo SE in 2017.

Scot
Based out of Cedarburg USA, Scot is a 50 year old manufacturer of centrifugal pumps with focus on the End Suction Single Stage pumps ranging from 3/4” through 12” with 1/3 through 125 HP motors. Scot concentrates on the OEM end-suction pump market for the plastics, agricultural and chemical industries. Scot also has a branch office in Fort Lauderdale, Florida, which manufactures special-purpose marine pumps for the shipbuilding industry. Scot Pumps was acquired by Wilo USA in 2017.

Timeline 
 1872 Foundation of the company "Messingwarenfabrik Louis Opländer Maschinenbau"
 1928 Invention of the world's first circulation accelerator
 1965 Wilo international: Foundation of own subsidiaries
 1984 Acquisition of the French pump manufacturer Pompes Salmson
 1988 Launch of Wilo "Star-E", the world's first electronically regulated circulation pump
 1994 New production plant, Wilo Pumps Ltd., opened in Korea
 2001 In-house electronic production, Dortmund
 2003 Acquisition of the EMU Unterwasserpumpen GmbH and EMU Anlagenbau GmbH
 2005 Acquisition of Mather & Platt Pumps Ltd., India
 2006 Acquisition of Circulating Pumps Ltd., King's Lynn, Norfolk / England
 2008 Change from WILO AG to WILO SE (Societas Europaea)
 2011 Foundation of the Caspar Ludwig Opländer Foundation
 2014 Formation of Wilo Salmson France SAS merging Wilo France and Pompes Salmson
 2016 Acquisition of GVA Gesellschaft für Verfahren der Abwassertechnik mbH & Co.
 2016 Opening of new production plant in Moscow, Russia
 2017 Acquisition of Weil Pump, Scot Pump Karak Machine Corporation by Wilo USA.
 2019 Opening of MENA region headquarters and production plant in Dubai, United Arab Emirates
 2019 Acquisition of American-Marsh Pumps by Wilo USA
 2019 Ground breaking for new 244,000 ft² headquarters and production facility for Wilo USA
 2021 Opening of Wilopark, new headquarters of Wilo SE in Dortmund, spread across 200,000 m2 area

Main production sites 
 WILO SE, Dortmund/Germany
 WILO SE, Oschersleben/Germany
 WILO SE, Hof/Germany
 WILO EMU Anlagenbau GmbH, Roth/Germany
 WILO France SAS, Laval/France
 WILO Intec S.A.S., Aubigny/France
 WILO USA LLC, Cedarburg/Wisconsin/USA
 WILO USA LLC, Thomasville/Georgia/USA
 WILO RUS o.o.o., Moscow/Russia
 WILO China Ltd., Beijing/China
 WILO ELEC China Ltd., Qinhuangdao/China
 WILO Pumps Ltd., Busan/Korea
 WILO Mather and Platt Pumps Pvt. Ltd., Pune/India
 WILO Mather and Platt Pumps Pvt. Ltd., Kolhapur/India
 WILO Pompa Sistemleri A.Ş., Istanbul/Turkey
 WILO SYSTEMS ITALIA SRL, Bari/Italy
 WILO Middle East, Dubai/United Arab Emirates

Notes 

Pump manufacturers
Manufacturing companies based in Dortmund
German brands